Hong Kong is one of the earliest participants in the AFC Asian Cup, and was also the first host in the tournament, in the inaugural 1956 edition. Hong Kong, since then, had qualified for two another tournaments in 1964 and 1968. The best result of Hong Kong is third place and it has remained as Hong Kong's best achievement in football.

In 2022, Hong Kong qualified for the 2023 Asian Cup for the first time in 55 years.

Competitive record

1956 AFC Asian Cup

1964 AFC Asian Cup

1968 AFC Asian Cup

2023 AFC Asian Cup

Squads
 1956 AFC Asian Cup squads
 1964 AFC Asian Cup squads
 1968 AFC Asian Cup squads

References

Countries at the AFC Asian Cup
Hong Kong national football team